Marc-Andrea Hüsler and Sem Verbeek were the defending champions but chose not to defend their title.

Darian King and Peter Polansky won the title after defeating Hunter Reese and Adil Shamasdin 7–6(10–8), 6–3 in the final.

Seeds

Draw

References

External links
 Main draw

Winnipeg National Bank Challenger - Doubles
2019 Doubles